The Netherlands participated in the Eurovision Song Contest 1998 with the song "Hemel en aarde" written by Eric van Tijn and Jochem Fluitsma. The song was performed by Edsilia Rombley. The Dutch broadcaster Nederlandse Omroep Stichting (NOS) organised the national final Nationaal Songfestival 1998 in order to select the Dutch entry for the 1998 contest in Birmingham, United Kingdom. Eight entries competed in the national final on 8 March 1998 where "Hemel en aarde" performed by Edsilia Rombley was selected as the winner following the combination of votes from an eight-member jury panel and a public vote.

The Netherlands competed in the Eurovision Song Contest which took place on 9 May 1998. Performing during the show in position 18, the Netherlands placed fourth out of the 25 participating countries, scoring 150 points.

Background 

The Dutch least successful result has been last place, which they have achieved on four occasions, most recently in the 1968 contest.

The Dutch national broadcaster, Nederlandse Omroep Stichting (NOS), broadcast the event within the Netherlands and organises the selection process for the nation's entry. The Netherlands has used various methods to select the Dutch entry in the past, such as the Nationaal Songfestival, a live televised national final to choose the performer, song or both to compete at Eurovision. However, internal selections have also been held on occasion. In 1997, NOS has internally selected the Dutch artist for the contest, while Nationaal Songfestival was organised in order to select the song. For 1998, Nationaal Songfestival was continued to select both the artist and song.

Before Eurovision

Nationaal Songfestival 1998 
Nationaal Songfestival 1998 was the national final developed by NOS that selected the Dutch entry for the Eurovision Song Contest 1998. Eight entries competed in the competition that consisted of a final on 8 March 1998 which took place at the Rai Congrescentrum in Amsterdam, hosted by Paul de Leeuw and Linda de Mol and was broadcast on TV2.

Competing entries
107 submissions were received by the Dutch broadcaster following a submission period and the eight selected competing entries were announced on 2 February 1998. Four of the entries for the competition came from the public submission, while the remaining four entries came from composers directly invited by NOS.

Final
The final took place on 8 March 1998 where eight entries competed. The winner, "Hemel en aarde" performed by Edsilia Rombley, was selected by the 50/50 combination of a public televote and the votes of an eight-member expert jury. The viewers and the juries each had a total of 256 points to award. Each juror distributed their points as follows: 1, 2, 3, 4, 5, 7 and 10 points. The viewer vote was based on the percentage of votes each song achieved. For example, if a song gained 10% of the vote, then that entry would be awarded 10% of 256 points rounded to the nearest integer: 26 points. In addition to the performances of the competing entries, the show featured guest performances by British 1997 Eurovision winner Katrina and the Waves.

At Eurovision
According to Eurovision rules, all nations with the exceptions of the eight countries which had obtained the lowest average number of points over the last five contests competed in the final on 9 May 1998. On 13 November 1997, a special allocation draw was held which determined the running order and the Netherlands was set to perform in position 18, following the entry from Cyprus and before the entry from Sweden. The Dutch conductor at the contest was Dick Bakker, and the Netherlands finished in fourth place with 150 points.

The show was broadcast in the Netherlands on TV2 with commentary by Willem van Beusekom as well as via radio on Radio 2. The Dutch spokesperson, who announced the Dutch votes during the show, was Conny Vandenbos.

Voting 
Below is a breakdown of points awarded to the Netherlands and awarded by the Netherlands in the contest. The nation awarded its 12 points to Germany in the contest.

References

External links
Dutch National Final 1998

1998
Countries in the Eurovision Song Contest 1998
Eurovision